East Oakdale is an unincorporated census-designated place (CDP) on the Stanislaus River, located east of the city of Oakdale in Stanislaus County, California.

It is part of the Modesto Metropolitan Statistical Area in the San Joaquin Valley. The population was 2,762 at the 2010 census.

Geography
East Oakdale is located at  (37.793528, -120.806669).

History
There were three ferries crossing the Stanislaus River on the 19th−century Stockton - Los Angeles Road.  The site of the easternmost crossing, Heath & Emory's Ferry, is in present-day East Oakdale. The second, Taylor's Ferry Crossing, was located in the present day city of Oakdale. The third, Islips Ferry, was further down river in present-day  Langworth.

Demographics

2010
The 2010 United States Census reported that East Oakdale had a population of 2,762. The racial makeup of East Oakdale was 2,530 (91.6%) White, 7 (0.3%) African American, 18 (0.7%) Native American, 60 (2.2%) Asian, 5 (0.2%) Pacific Islander, 78 (2.8%) from other races, and 64 (2.3%) from two or more races. Hispanic or Latino of any race were 284 persons (10.3%).

The Census reported that 2,762 people (100% of the population) lived in households, 0 (0%) lived in non-institutionalized group quarters, and 0 (0%) were institutionalized.

There were 1,055 households, out of which 301 (28.5%) had children under the age of 18 living in them, 809 (76.7%) were opposite-sex married couples living together, 40 (3.8%) had a female householder with no husband present, 27 (2.6%) had a male householder with no wife present.  There were 31 (2.9%) unmarried opposite-sex partnerships, and 3 (0.3%) same-sex married couples or partnerships. 138 households (13.1%) were made up of individuals, and 78 (7.4%) had someone living alone who was 65 years of age or older. The average household size was 2.62.  There were 876 families (83.0% of all households); the average family size was 2.87.

The population was spread out, with 562 people (20.3%) under the age of 18, 159 people (5.8%) aged 18 to 24, 413 people (15.0%) aged 25 to 44, 1,046 people (37.9%) aged 45 to 64, and 582 people (21.1%) who were 65 years of age or older.  The median age was 50.0 years. For every 100 females, there were 94.5 males.  For every 100 females age 18 and over, there were 97.0 males.

The homeowner vacancy rate was 1.8%; the rental vacancy rate was 5.3%.  2,553 people (92.4% of the population) lived in owner-occupied housing units and 209 people (7.6%) lived in rental housing units.

2000
As of the census of 2000, there were 2,742 people, 989 households, and 824 families residing in the CDP. The racial makeup of the CDP was 91.28% White, 0.36% African American, 1.86% Native American, 1.64% Asian, 0.07% Pacific Islander, 2.08% from other races, and 2.70% from two or more races. Hispanic or Latino of any race were 6.82% of the population.

There were 989 households, out of which 33.1% had children under the age of 18 living with them, 75.8% were married couples living together, 5.4% had a female householder with no husband present, and 16.6% were non-families. 13.5% of all households were made up of individuals, and 5.9% had someone living alone who was 65 years of age or older.  The average household size was 2.77 and the average family size was 3.03.

In the CDP, the population was spread out, with 25.3% under the age of 18, 5.5% from 18 to 24, 22.2% from 25 to 44, 34.0% from 45 to 64, and 13.0% who were 65 years of age or older.  The median age was 44 years. For every 100 females, there were 104.9 males.  For every 100 females age 18 and over, there were 102.9 males.

The median income for a household in the CDP was $70,227, and the median income for a family was $83,587. Males had a median income of $70,096 versus $36,602 for females. The per capita income for the CDP was $40,633.  About 5.1% of families and 7.9% of the population were below the poverty line, including 11.3% of those under age 18 and 3.0% of those age 65 or over.

Government

References

Census-designated places in Stanislaus County, California
Oakdale, California
Stanislaus River
Census-designated places in California